Past elected presidents of the Oxford Union are listed below, with their college and the year/term in which they served. Iterum indicates that a person was serving a second term as president (which is not possible under the current Union rules).

Key

Presidents of the United Debating Society

These are the Presidents as listed

Presidents of the Oxford Union Society

1826–1831
These are the presidents as listed

1831–1850

1850–1875

1875–1900

1900–1925

1925–1950

1950–1975

1975–2000

2000–present

Other notable officeholders
The 3rd Marquess of Salisbury was Union Secretary in Michaelmas 1848.

Harold Macmillan was Secretary of the Union in Hilary 1914, then Junior Treasurer (elected unopposed, which was then very unusual) in Trinity 1914; but for the war he would "almost certainly" have been President.

S. W. R. D. Bandaranaike was Treasurer in Trinity 1924.

Humayun Kabir was Librarian in 1931.

Ann Widdecombe was Treasurer in 1972, after having served as Secretary the previous year.

Jacob Rees-Mogg was Librarian in 1990, losing the election for the presidency to future Education Secretary Damian Hinds.

In fiction

Simon Kerslake (early 1950s), protagonist of the Jeffrey Archer novel First Among Equals invites sitting Prime Minister Winston Churchill to propose the motion during Eights Week that "This House Would Rather be a Commoner than a Lord". His future rival, The Hon. Charles Seymour listens from the floor and resolves to enter politics also. Archer himself was elected to Standing Committee for one term in 1965.

Notes

References

Bibliography

Hollis, Christopher. The Oxford Union. London: Evans, 1965.
 

 
Presidents